Giannis Papakostas is a Greek football manager. Papakostas began his coaching career at Eleusina and Chalkidona and PAS Giannina that he brought into the semi-final of Greek Cup in the season 2006–2007. Papakostas later cut his teeth on such clubs as Panserraikos and Kavala FC.

References

1968 births
Living people
Sportspeople from Sydney
Greek football managers
PAS Giannina F.C. managers
Panserraikos F.C. managers
Athlitiki Enosi Larissa F.C. managers
A.O. Kerkyra managers
Kavala F.C. managers
Panachaiki F.C. managers

Footballers from Athens
Greek footballers